Yemen is divided into twenty-one governorates (muhafazah) and one municipality (amanah):

Notes:
a - Also known as Sanaa City
b - Socatra Governorate was created in December 2013 from parts of Hadramaut, data included there

The governorates are subdivided into 333 districts (muderiah), which are subdivided into 1,996 sub-districts, and then into 40,793 villages and 88,817 sub villages (as of 2013).

Before 1990, Yemen existed as two separate entities. South Yemen consisted of modern Aden, Abyan, Al Mahrah, Dhale, Hadramaut, Socotra, Lahij, and Shabwah Governorates, while the rest made up North Yemen. For more information, see Historic Governorates of Yemen.

See also

 ISO 3166-2:YE

References

 
Subdivisions of Yemen
Yemen, Governorates
Yemen 1
Governorates, Yemen
Yemen geography-related lists
Yemen